Magnolia dodecapetala is a species of plant in the genus Magnolia, family Magnoliaceae. It was described by a French naturalist named Lamarck, and it obtained the name from a Belgian botanist named Rafaël Herman Anna Govaerts.

References

dodecapetala